Elliott Smith (1969–2003) was an American singer-songwriter and musician.

Elliott Smith, Elliott-Smith or Elliot Smith may also refer to:

Elliott Smith (album), a 1995 album by Elliott Smith
Elliott Smith (book), a 2007 biography about Elliott Smith
Elliott F. Smith (1931–1987), American politician in the New Jersey General Assembly
Bruce Elliott-Smith, British songwriter and producer
Charles Henry Elliott-Smith (1889–1994), British air commodore
Grafton Elliot Smith (1871–1937), Australian-British archaeologist and anatomist
Elliot Smith (American football) (born 1967), defensive back
Elliot Smith House, a historic house in Worcester, Massachusetts